is a passenger railway station in the city of Tomioka, Gunma, Japan, operated by the private railway operator Jōshin Dentetsu.

Lines

Station layout
The station consists of a single side platform serving traffic in both directions.

Adjacent stations

History
Higashi-Tomioka Station opened on 1 April 1990.

Surrounding area

Tomioka General Hospital

See also
 List of railway stations in Japan

External links

 Jōshin Dentetsu 
 Burari-Gunma 

Railway stations in Gunma Prefecture
Railway stations in Japan opened in 1990
Tomioka, Gunma